Tennis Elbow is a series of tennis video games developed by France-based firm Mana Games.  Its first version was released in 1996 and as of May 2015 it is currently on its 2013 version, available for Windows, Mac & Linux platforms.

The game is simulation oriented, and is often seen as being the one offering the most realistic tennis experience in term of rallies and tennis sensations.

The most noticeable particularity of its gameplay is that the users have to hold down the strike button till their player actually strikes the ball, unlike most other tennis games that require the users to release the strike button earlier.

After more than 2 years spent in Steam Greenlight, the 2013 version was released on Steam on March 13, 2015.

The game is regularly updated and as of July 2018 has seen 10 major updates for the 2013 edition.

The next edition is called "Tennis Elbow 4" and its early version was planned for 2019. It was released on 4 June 2021, and is still in early access as of 10 March 2022.

Games

Tennis Elbow (1997)
The first release in this tennis series allows players to compete in a World Tour of 90 events against 250 players. Single matches can be dirty up and dirty down (two against one) as well as the more conventional singles and doubles. Grass, clay, flexi and cement courts are featured. Action replays can be viewed in slow motion, fast speed, and rewound.

Players can be defined as volleyers, defenders, punchers or varied, with definable kit colours and playing abilities. As you play the game, your player’s ability improves, resulting in faster and more accurate serves as well as faster running and bigger jumps.

The action is viewed from a 3rd-person angle, and side changes are optional. Two buttons are used in combination with directional presses to make slices, 3 different types of lob, and subtle drop shots.

Tennis Elbow 2004 is an enhanced Windows port of the original Tennis Elbow

Tennis Elbow 2006 (2006)
Tennis Elbow 2006 allows players to compete in a World Tour of 125 events against 300 players. Both the entry and Champions' Race ranking systems are incorporated - the former covering the last 52 weeks and the latter being fixed over a single calendar year.

Single matches can be two against one, as well as the more conventional singles and doubles. Network and internet play is offered. There are seven distinct court types - clay, grass, hard, blue-green hard, synthetic, indoor hard and indoor synthetic. Action replays can be viewed in slow motion, fast speed, and rewound.

Players can be defined as volleyers, defenders, punchers or varied, with definable kit colours and playing abilities. As you play the game, your player’s ability improves - by more if your lose. Assign these points for faster and more accurate serves as well as faster running and bigger jumps.

The action is viewed from a 3rd-person angle, and side changes are optional. Two buttons are used in combination with directional presses to make slices, 3 different types of lob, and subtle drop shots.

Tennis Elbow Manager (2009)
In this tennis manager game, you take control of a tennis coach and his player, and your goal is to reach the Number One ranking in the world, to stay there as long as possible and win as many Grand Slam titles as possible.

Men or Women Tour
3500 players evolving over 38 years, from 1990 to 2027
More than 300 tournaments
World Team Cup and Masters Cup
Singles & doubles
Up to 4 coached players
5 difficulty levels
Full ranking system (like the entry one from ATP)
In-game languages : English, French, Deutsch, Croatian, Italian, Dutch

The game was Greenlit on Steam and later released on October 14, 2016

Tennis Elbow 2013 (2013)
Tennis Elbow 2013 follows the previous instalments in the Tennis Elbow series. It is described as an updated version of the previous title Tennis Elbow 2011 and it is provided for free to owners of that game. It features a simulative approach to tennis, and offers, along with local and online multiplayer, three singleplayer modes: training, single match, and World Tour, a career mode.

The World Tour sees you play with your created player, or an existing one (there are several dozens of real-world unlicensed famous and less famous, including — as to the males — Sampras, Agassi, Kafelnikov, Becker, Stich, Edberg and more, Graf Navratilova Sanchez Vicario Seles and more as for the females) and start from the bottom of the ranking and the smallest tournaments, with the aim to gain the top position in world rank during a span of 15 years. Available tournaments over a whole year are about three hundreds, but low ranked players can not access main competitions.

Gameplay can be tweaked to more or less simulative through options such as turning fatigue on or off, having the indicators of where our shots and the opponent's will impact on the court displayed or not, different CPU levels (6 in total, from "beginner" to "incredible"), and choosing from Arcade, Simulation, Elite "Controls", which impacts the gameplay, making it easier or harder to do good shots.

Player statistics include parameters for power, consistency, precision, for each of the fundamental shots (forehand, backhand, service), plus for volley play (net presence, forehand and backhand volley, smash), fitness (speed, tonicity, stamina), and special skills (drop shot, lob, counter, stamina); parameters range from 1% to 100%. Doubles can be played with four human players on one computer, or on two computers with two players per computer by LAN or Internet, but not on four computers.

The game was Greenlit on Steam and later released on March 13, 2015

Tennis Elbow 2009 and Tennis Elbow 2011 are versions of Tennis Elbow 2013

Tennis Elbow Manager 2 (2018)
Become a tennis coach and manage up to 9 players: take care of training sessions, planning, sponsors, team members, and take control of them on the tennis court if you wish so! Will you be able to lead your players to the top of the world hierarchy?

The game also features a full 3D match engine, which lets you play tennis as you want in the Training Club.

In addition, you can optionally take the control of your player during the tournament 3D matches. A little warning though: the management part will get a bit unbalanced from this, as some skills will be of lesser importance when you play all by yourself.

The match engine is based on the Tennis Elbow 2013 one, already acclaimed by many players as the most realistic tennis game, but with a new & improved physics for the ball, court, strikes & players !

The AI is also greatly improved, with new player strategies and more realistic behaviors.

The game was released early access in the official website on March 8, 2018, then in Steam on June 7, 2019.

Tennis Elbow 4 
This game uses the Unity Engine. It launched on 4th June 2021 in early access. As of February 2023, it is still in early access.

References

External links

Steam Store Page

1996 video games
Linux games
Classic Mac OS games
Tennis video games
Video game franchises
Video games developed in France
Windows games